Mesfer Al-Qahtani (born 15 January 1984) is a Saudi Arabian footballer who played as a defender in the Saudi Premier League. He initially played for Al-Shabab before joining Al-Ittihad. During the 2002–03 Saudi Premier League season, on 25 March 2003 he scored against Al-Riyadh.

While playing for Al-Ittihad he made one appearance for the Saudi Arabia national under-20 football team at the 2003 FIFA World Youth Championship. He also appeared in the third place match of the 2005 FIFA Club World Championship against Deportivo Saprissa in Yokohama, Japan.

Later he briefly played for Al-Hilal before retiring in 2009.

References

External links

1984 births
Living people
Association football defenders
Saudi Arabian footballers
Saudi Arabia youth international footballers
Al Hilal SFC players
Al-Shabab FC (Riyadh) players
Ittihad FC players
Al-Najma SC players
Sportspeople from Riyadh
Saudi First Division League players
Saudi Professional League players